The 2022 League of Legends World Championship was an esports tournament for the multiplayer online battle arena video game League of Legends. It was the twelfth iteration of the League of Legends World Championship, an annual international tournament organized by the game's developer, Riot Games. The tournament was held from September 29 to November 5 in Mexico and the United States. Twenty-four teams from 11 regions qualified for the tournament based on their placement in regional circuits such as those in China, Europe, North America, South Korea, Taiwan/Hong Kong/Macau/Southeast Asia and Vietnam, with twelve of those teams having to reach the main event via a play-in stage.

On August 29, Riot Games announced and revealed the new Summoner's Cup that would be awarded to the winner of the finals. "Star Walkin'" was announced as the tournament's theme song, performed by Lil Nas X.

DRX won the tournament after defeating T1 3–2 in a close final series. This was the first international title won by DRX, as well as the first by a play-in team. DRX's advance to the finals was widely described by commentators as a Cinderella run. DRX was considered an underdog team, having barely qualified for the tournament as South Korea's final seed, and having been pitted against a number of tournament favorites, including defending world champions Edward Gaming.

Qualified teams and rosters

Qualified teams 
China (LPL) and South Korea (LCK) received an additional spot, totaling up to four representatives each for their respective region.

Due to the ongoing Russian invasion of Ukraine, CIS (LCL) will not be able to send their representative this year, their slot will be given to the Europe (LEC) due to their strong performance over the past two years, making the LEC having four representatives for the region.

Top 4 regions in 2022 Mid-Season Invitational (LPL, LCK, LEC, LCS) are seeded to pool 1 in the main event's group stage for the summer champion.

Rosters 
 Player did not play any games.

Venues 

Mexico City, New York City, Atlanta and San Francisco were the four cities chosen to host the tournament. Toronto formerly had been chosen to host the semifinals, but later Riot Games decided to host in Atlanta due to COVID-19 impacting the viability of securing multi-entry visas from Canada to the United States within necessary timelines.

Play-in stage

Play-in groups 

 Date and time: September 29 – October 2.
 Twelve teams were drawn into two groups with six teams in each group based on their seeding. Two teams from the LEC could not be placed in the same group.
 Single round robin, all matches were best-of-one.
 If teams had the same win–loss record, tie-breaker matches were played. A two-way tie was not broken by the results of the head-to-head game those teams played, however the team that won in the head-to-head received side selection in the tiebreaker game.
 The top team automatically qualified for the main event, while second to fourth-placed teams of each group advanced to the play-in knockouts, and the second-placed team received a bye to match 2. The bottom two teams were eliminated.

Group A 

Evil Geniuses, LOUD and DetonatioN FocusMe were in a three-way-tie for second place at the end of the group stage. Because placement in the subsequent tiebreaker matches was determined by the combined game time of each team's wins, LOUD was awarded a bye to the second tiebreaker match for having the shortest total game time.

Group B

Play-in knockouts 
 Date and time: October 3–4.
 King of the hill format with two branch. The third-placed teams from the group stage faced the fourth-placed teams from the same group in match 1. Winners then played against the second-placed teams from the other group in match 2.
 Single-elimination. All matches were best-of-five.
 The winners of the match 2 in each branch advanced to the main event group stage.

Branch B2-A3-A4

Match 1 
 Date: October 3

Match 2 
 Date: October 4

Branch A2-B3-B4

Match 1 
 Date: October 3

Match 2 
 Date: October 4

Group stage 

 Date and time: October 7–16
 Sixteen teams were drawn into four groups with four teams in each group based on their seeding. Teams of the same region could not be placed in the same group.
 In the scenario where both the LEC 3rd and 4th seeded teams advanced to the group stage, the 4th seeded team would not be subject to the rule preventing a group from having more than one team from the same region in it.
 In the scenario where either LEC team was eliminated from the competition during the play-in stage, the rule would remain in place.
 Double round robin, all matches were best-of-one.
 If teams had the same win–loss record and head-to-head record, tiebreaker matches were played for first or second place. If more than two teams had the same record, tiebreaker placement was based on the combined times of teams' victorious games.
 Top two teams advanced to knockout stage. Bottom two teams were eliminated.

Group A

Group B

Group C

Group D

Knockout stage 

 Date and time: October 20 – November 5
 Eight teams from group stage were drawn into a single elimination bracket.
 All matches were best-of-five.
 The first-placed team of each group was drawn against the second-placed team of a different group.
 The first-placed team chose the side for the first game. Loser of the previous game chose the side for the next game.
 Teams from the same group were on opposite sides of the bracket, meaning they could not play each other until the finals.

Quarter-finals 

 The winner(s) advanced to the semi-finals.

Match 1 

 Date: October 20

Match 2 

 Date: October 21

Match 3 

 Date: October 22

Match 4 

 Date: October 23

Semi-finals 

 The winner(s) advanced to the finals.

Match 1 

 Date: October 29

Match 2 

 Date: October 30

Finals 

 Date: November 5
 The members of the winning team lifted the Summoner's Cup, earning their title as the League of Legends 2022 World Champions.

Ranking

Team ranking 

 (*) Not including tie-break games.

Regional ranking 

 Regional ranking is the basis for Riot Games to decide number of slots and pools of each region at MSI and Worlds' events in the future.
 The win-ratio is determined by number of won games compared the number of games played.
 Bracket stage wins are prioritized.
 (*) Group stages: does not include tiebreaker games
 (**) Playoffs: does not include games from "regional civil wars" (2 teams from same region play each other).

References

Notes 

League of Legends World Championship
2022 multiplayer online battle arena tournaments
The Game Awards winners